Selbjørnsfjorden is a fjord in Vestland county, Norway. It is a wide fjord that starts at the Slåtterøy Lighthouse at the North Sea in the west and flows to the strait of Langenuen in the east. The fjord is named after the nearby island of Selbjørn.

See also
 List of Norwegian fjords

References

Fjords of Vestland
Austevoll
Fitjar
Bømlo